Hibetullah Sultan ("gift of Allah"; 16 March 1789 – 19 September 1841) was an Ottoman princess, the daughter of Sultan Abdul Hamid I, and his consort Şebsefa Kadın. She was the half sister of Sultans Mustafa IV and Mahmud II.

Early life
Hibetullah Sultan was born on 16 March 1789 in the Topkapı Palace. Her father was Sultan Abdul Hamid I, and her mother was Şebsefa Kadın. She was the youngest child of her parents and the youngest child of her father, who died a month after her birth. She had a brother Şehzade Mehmed Nusret, six years elder then her, two sisters, Alemşah Sultan, four years elder then her, and Emine Sultan, one year elder then her. After her father's death in 1789, she and her mother settled in the Old Palace.

Marriage
In 1801, when Hibetullah was twelve years old, her cousin Sultan Selim III betrothed her to her cousin Sultanzade Alaeddin Pasha, the son of Seyyid Ahmed Pasha and Hatice Sultan, daughter of Mustafa III. The marriage took place on 3 February 1803. The couple were given Kadırga Palace as their residence.

In 1808, after the dethronement of her elder half-brother Sultan Mustafa IV, Hibetullah Sultan and her elder half-sister Esma Sultan, who were involved in state affairs, were kept under close surveillance by Sultan Mahmud II, and were forbade to make communications with outsiders.

Hibetullah hadn't know child. She was widowed at Alaeddin Pasha's death in 1812. She was twenty three years old.  Like the princesses of her generation she didn’t remarried.

After the death of her mother in 1805, all her çiftlıks of her mother were assigned to her.

Death
Hibetullah Sultan died on 19 September 1841 in the Kadırga Palace which was the palace of her aunt Esma Sultan, and was buried in the mausoleum of her brother Sultan Mahmud II, Divanyolu, Istanbul.

Ancestry

See also
 List of Ottoman princesses

References

Sources

1788 births
1841 deaths
Royalty from Istanbul
18th-century Ottoman princesses
19th-century Ottoman princesses